The Statute Law Revision Act 1870 (33 & 34 Vict c 69) is an Act of the Parliament of the United Kingdom.

It repealed enactments relating to the National Debt and to forgery. It was intended, in particular, to facilitate the preparation of the revised edition of the statutes then in progress.

The Schedule to this Act was repealed by the Statute Law Revision Act 1894 (57 & 58 Vict c 56).

This Act was repealed by section 1(1) of, and Part XIII of Schedule 1 to, the Statute Law (Repeals) Act 1986.

This Act was retained for the Republic of Ireland by section 2(2)(a) of, and Part 4 of Schedule 1 to, the Statute Law Revision Act 2007.

See also
Statute Law Revision Act

References
Halsbury's Statutes,
The Incorporated Council of Law Reporting for England and Wales. The Law Reports: The Public General Statutes passed in Thirty-third and Thirty-fourth Years of the Reign of Her Majesty Queen Victoria, 1870. London. 1870. Pages 341 et seq. Digistised copy from Google Books.

External links
List of amendments and repeals in the Republic of Ireland from the Irish Statute Book

United Kingdom Acts of Parliament 1870